Dâw is a Nadahup language spoken by about one hundred Dâw people in the northwestern part of Amazonas, Brazil, in an area commonly known as Alto Rio Negro. Most Dâw also speak Nheengatu and Portuguese.

An extinct variety, Kurikuria(r)í, named after the Curicuriari River, was a distinct language sociolinguistically, but at least partially intelligible with Dâw.

Phonology

Vowels 
Dâw has 15 vowels:

Vowels are laryngealized when occurring beside a glottal stop, as seen in the examples below.

  "large mouth"
  "to lack"

Vowel harmony 
Vowel harmony in Dâw is seen primarily in two situations: in compounding and with the focus marker , where V indicates a vowel. When combining two words with the first word having the syllable structure CVC, vowel harmony is not seen, e.g.  "high" +  "boat" =  "airplane". However, when combining two words with the first word having the syllable structure CV, vowel harmony is seen, e.g.  "canoe" +  "eye" =  "sun". The vowel of the focus marker  is the same as the vowel of the syllable it is appended to, e.g.  "blood" +  = .

Consonants 
Dâw has 25 consonants:

Glottalized consonants are also laryngealized, as seen in the examples below.

  "oar"
  "banana"

The plosive consonants have no audible release as codas, e.g. "without hair",  "to hook".

Stress 
Stress is fixed in Dâw, occurring on the last syllable of a word. A few suffixes in Dâw do not take the stress, however. The suffixes are divided into two groups, metric suffixes and extrametric suffixes. The former follows the general rule of stress on the last syllable, while the latter does not. See the examples below, where  is a metric suffix, and  an extrametric suffix.

  "to return"
  "return!"
  "is returning"

Tone 
In Dâw there are either three or four tones, depending on analysis. There are a low tone, a high tone, a rising tone and a falling tone, marked by a grave accent, an acute accent, a caron and circumflex, respectively, but only the two latter are lexical. The low tone only occurs on syllables without stress, while the high tone only occurs on syllables with stress, and the rising and falling tones may occur on all syllables.

Besides the lexical function of tone, tone may also function morphologically and syntactically. Consider the examples below, the first being morphological and the second being syntactical, showing how tone is used in a derivative manner and how tone is used to differentiate intransitive from transitive verbs.

  "to eat"
  "food"

  "to bathe (oneself)"
  "to bathe (someone)"

Vowel length is predictable and present in Dâw, yet not distinctive lexically. All vowels with a rising or falling tone are long, while all vowels without a tone are short.

Orthography 
The orthography used by the Dâw community is based on the Latin alphabet, with some correspondences coming from the Tukano language. Note that glottalized consonants are marked with the apostrophe before the consonant when the phoneme appears at the beginning of a word, and after the consonant when it appears anywhere else. Long vowels (i.e., those with tone) are written with two of the same vowel (e.g. , "rat"). When the circumflex or tilde are used with long vowels, only the first of the two is marked with the diacritic (e.g. ).

External links 

 Dâw basic lexicon at the Global Lexicostatistical Database
 ELAR archive of Documentation of Dâw

Notes

General 
 
 

Languages of Brazil
Nadahup languages